The 2016 season is FK Žalgiris 7th consecutive season in the top flight of Lithuanian football and 3rd consecutive as A Lyga title defenders. They also participated in the Lithuanian Cup, SuperCup and enter the UEFA Champions League at the second qualifying round stage.

After winning 2015–16 Lithuanian Football Cup club has achieved the longest active consecutive domestic cup run in Europe with five victories in a row. After another consecutive win in 2016 LFF Cup they extended the record to 6 victories, while also setting new Lithuanian record - winning two domestic cups in a single calendar year.

Žalgiris were crowned champions for the fourth year in a row on 30 October after a 2-0 win against Atlantas.

After the season club leaders received multiple personal awards: long time club servant Mantas Kuklys was included between final 7 candidates to win Lithuanian footballer of the year award and remained fourth overall. Furthermore, he was elected as the best player in Lithuania managing to beat teammates Andrija Kaluđerović and Vytautas Lukša who respectively remained in second and fourth places. Despite joining only in summer, Kaluđerović also was declared as Fans player of the year - traditional award given by club supporters group Pietų IV. According to the fans club defender Mamadou Mbodj remained 2nd and 3rd place was taken by Kuklys. Youngsters Justas Lasickas and Daniel Romanovskij remained respectively 3rd and 5th in the most promising player of the season elections, midfielder Matija Ljujić received prize for the best goal of the season and head coach Valdas Dambrauskas also wasn't forgotten and received coach of the year award.

2016 season was concluded with special event where film "„Žalgiris-2016“. The year of triumph" about historical season highlighted with victory of four domestic titles premiered.

Players

Transfers

Winter 2016

In

Out

Summer 2016

In

Out

Pre-season and friendlies

Competitions

Lithuanian Supercup

A Lyga

Results summary

Results by round

Regular season

League table

Matches

Championship round

League table

Matches

LFF Taurė

2015–16 LFF Taurė

All previous rounds were played during the 2015 FK Žalgiris season.

Semifinals

Final

2016 LFF Taurė

UEFA Champions League

Second qualifying round

Statistics

Appearances and goals

|-
! colspan=14 style=background:#dcdcdc; text-align:center| Goalkeepers

|-
! colspan=14 style=background:#dcdcdc; text-align:center| Defenders

|-
! colspan=14 style=background:#dcdcdc; text-align:center| Midfielders

|-
! colspan=14 style=background:#dcdcdc; text-align:center| Forwards

|-
! colspan=14 style=background:#dcdcdc; text-align:center| Players transferred out during the season

Goalscorers

Clean sheets

Disciplinary record

Awards

A Lyga Player of the Year

Fans' Player of the Season

A Lyga Goal of the Year

Lithuania Coach of the Year

A Lyga Team of the Week
The following players were named in the A lyga Team of the Week.

Fans' Player of the Month

External links
 2016 FK Žalgiris - Triumfo metai

References

FK Žalgiris seasons
Žalgiris
Žalgiris